Plymouth Voyager is a nameplate for a range of vans that were marketed by the Plymouth division of Chrysler.  From 1974 until 1983, the Voyager was a full-size van, sold as the counterpart of Dodge Sportsman (later the Dodge Ram Wagon).  For 1984, the Voyager became a Chrysler minivan sold alongside the Dodge Caravan; as a minivan, three generations of the Voyager were sold from 1984 until 2000.  Following the closure of the Plymouth division in 2000, the Voyager was marketed under the Chrysler brand (as a lower-trim version of the Chrysler Town & Country), where it was sold through 2003.

From 1988 to 2016, Chrysler used the Chrysler Voyager name for export-market minivans; during the existence of the Plymouth brand, export-market Voyagers were produced with the body and trim of the Dodge Caravan.  When including the Plymouth Voyager and Dodge Caravan with their rebadged Chrysler, Lancia, and Volkswagen variants, the Chrysler minivans collectively rank as the 13th best-selling automotive model line worldwide.

The Plymouth Voyager minivan was assembled by Chrysler at its Windsor Assembly facility in Windsor, Ontario, Canada; from 1987 to 2000, the Voyager was also assembled at Saint Louis Assembly in Fenton, Missouri (North plant from 1987-1995; South plant from 1996-2000).  The full-size Plymouth Voyager van was assembled at the now-closed Pillette Road Truck Assembly facility in Windsor, Ontario, Canada and at the St. Louis North Assembly Plant in Fenton, Missouri.

Full-size van (AB; 1974-1983)

For the 1974 model year, Plymouth marketed trucks under its own brand (for the first time since 1942).  The Voyager was the Plymouth counterpart of the Dodge Sportsman passenger van alongside the Trail Duster SUV (a counterpart of the Dodge Ramcharger).  In contrast to Dodge, the Voyager was marketed solely as a passenger van; in line with the Sportsman, 12–15 passenger seating was offered.

Early versions of the Voyager were visually similar to their Dodge counterparts, centering Plymouth badging in the grille (as with Fargo vans and 1971-1973 Dodges).  For 1978, the B-pillar underwent a redesign, placing the side door further forward; the dashboard was redesigned (Dodge would use this design through 1997).  Externally distinguished by a new grille, the exterior saw a shift of the Plymouth lettering from the grille to the hood.   

For 1979, Chrysler introduced the second generation of the B-platform vans, marked by a longer front nose (and the discontinuation of big-block V8 engines).  Virtually indistinguishable from its Dodge Royal Sportsman counterpart, the parking lamps of the Voyager now wrapped into the front fenders, fitted with four rectangular headlamps.  For 1981, Dodge vans adopted the "Ram van" model nameplate (in line with Dodge pickup trucks); with a lack of large "RAM" badging on the door, the Voyager saw more differentiation from its Dodge counterpart.   

Following the 1983 model year, Plymouth discontinued the full-size Voyager, using the nameplate for its minivan; the 1983 full-size van would be the final full-size truck offered by the brand prior to its 2001 closure.

Background
Lee Iacocca and Hal Sperlich had conceived their idea for a modern minivan during their earlier tenure at Ford Motor Company.  Henry Ford II had rejected Iaccoca's and Sperlich's idea (and a prototype) of a minivan in 1974, then rumored to carry the name "Maxivan". Iaccoca followed Sperlich to Chrysler Corporation, and together they created the T115 minivan — a prototype that was to become the Caravan and Voyager, known colloquially as the "Magic-wagons" (a term used in advertising).

The Chrysler minivans launched a few months ahead of the Renault Espace (the first MPV/minivan in Europe, initially presented to executives as a Talbot (which was made up of Chrysler Europe's disposed assets) in 1979, but not launched until 1984), making them the first of their kind — effectively creating the modern minivan segment in the US.

First generation (S; 1984–1990)

In 1984, Chrysler marketed the rebadged Plymouth variant of its new minivan as the Voyager, using the Chrysler's S platform,  derived from the K-platform (Plymouth Reliant and Dodge Aries). The Voyager shared components with the K-cars including portions of the interior, e.g., the Reliant's instrument cluster and dashboard controls, along with the K-platform front-wheel drive layout and low floor, giving the Voyager a car-like ease of entry. The Voyager was on Car and Driver magazine's Ten Best list for 1985.

For 1987, the Voyager received minor cosmetic updates as well as the May 1987 introduction of the Grand Voyager, which was built on a longer wheelbase adding more cargo room. It was available only with SE or LE trim.

First-generation Voyager minivans were offered in three trim levels: an unnamed base model, mid-grade SE, and high-end LE, the latter bearing simulated woodgrain paneling. A sportier LX model was added in 1989, sharing much of its components with the Caravan ES.

Safety features included 3-point seat belts for the front two passengers and lap belts for rear passengers. Standard on all Voyagers were legally mandated side-impact reinforcements for all seating front and rear outboard positions. Safety features such as airbags or ABS were not available. Notably, the Voyager, along with the Dodge Caravan, are considered to be the first mass-produced vehicles to have dedicated built in cup holders.

Original commercials for the 1984 Voyager featured magician Doug Henning as a spokesperson to promote the Voyager "Magic Wagon's" versatility, cargo space, low step-in height, passenger volume, and maneuverability. Later commercials in 1989 featured rock singer Tina Turner. Canadian commercials in 1990 featured pop singer Celine Dion.

Seating
1984-1986 Voyagers could be equipped for five, six, seven passengers, with an eight-passenger variant available only in 1985. Five-passenger seating, standard on all trim levels, consisted of two front bucket seats and an intermediate three-passenger bench seat. In 1985, on base and SE models, the front buckets could be replaced by a 40/60 split three-passenger bench seat, bringing the total number of occupants to six. Seven-passenger seating was an option on SEs and LEs, with dual front buckets, an intermediate two-passenger bench, and a rear three-passenger bench. Eight-passenger seating was available on SE models only, with both the additional middle two-passenger bench and three-passenger front bench. Depending on configuration, the base model could seat up to six, the SE could seat up to eight, and the LE could seat up to seven.

The two bench seats in the rear were independently removable (though not foldable), and the large three-seat bench could also be installed in the 2nd row location via a second set of attachment points on the van's floor, ordinarily hidden with snap-in plastic covers. This configuration allowed for conventional five-passenger seating with a sizable cargo area in the rear. The latching mechanisms for the benches were very intuitive and easy to operate.

On base models, the front buckets were low-back items, upholstered with plain cloth or vinyl. On SEs, the buyer could choose between low-back buckets with deluxe cloth or high-back buckets in upgraded vinyl. LEs came standard with high-back front buckets, upholstered in either luxury cloth or luxury vinyl.

In 1985 and 1986, there was also a five-passenger version with a back seat that could be folded flat with the pull of a handle into a bed that filled the rear compartment from the back of the front seats to the rear. This option was known as the Magic Camper. The Magic Camper back seat had an extra rear-facing cushion that formed the back-most section of the bed when folded flat and the seat, though very heavy, was removable. The Magic Camper option included a tent that attached magnetically to the side of the vehicle allowing access in and out of the sliding side door.

For 1987 the six- and eight-passenger options were withdrawn, leaving seating for five standard and for seven optional on the base and SE, and seating for seven with high-back front buckets standard on the LE, Grand SE, and Grand LE. Deluxe cloth upholstery was now standard on base and all SE models, with the luxury vinyl optional on SEs. On LEs, luxury cloth came standard and for the first time, leather seats were available on the LE models.

Engines

For the first 3 years of production, two inline-4 engines with 2 barrel carburetors were offered. The base 2.2L was borrowed from the Chrysler K-cars, and produced  horsepower. The higher performance fuel injected version of the 2.2L engine later offered in the Chrysler K-cars was only offered in the Voyager for the 1987 model year, and would remain the base powerplant until mid-1987. Alongside the 2.2L, an optional Mitsubishi 2.6L engine was available producing  horsepower.

At launch, the Voyager's low horsepower to weight ratio had not been much of a concern. Its main competitors were the Toyota Van and the Volkswagen Vanagon, both of which offered similar performance. In mid-1987, the base 2.2L I4 was replaced with a fuel-injected 2.5L I4, which produced , while the Mitsubishi G54B I4 was replaced with the new fuel-injected 3.0L Mitsubishi V-6 producing  in March of that year.

A turbocharged version of the base 2.5L producing  was available in 1989 and 1990. In 1990, a new  3.3L V-6 was added to the option list. Sales of the 2.5 turbo dwindled as a result, and it was dropped at the end of the year.

 1984–1987 2.2 L K I4, 
 1984–1987 2.6 L Mitsubishi G54B I4, 
 1987½–1990 2.5 L K I4, 
 1987½–1988 3.0 L Mitsubishi 6G72 V6, 
 1989–1990 2.5 L Turbo I4, 
 1989-1990 3.0 L Mitsubishi 6G72 V6, 
 1990 3.3 L EGA V6,

Transmissions
Both a three-speed TorqueFlite automatic transmission and a five-speed manual were available with all inline-four engines, including the turbocharged 2.5 L (this was a rare combination). V-6 engines were only offered with the venerable fully hydraulically operated TorqueFlite, until the computer controlled Ultradrive 4-speed automatic became available in 1989. The Ultradrive offered much better fuel economy and responsiveness, particularly when paired with the inline-four engine.

Second generation (AS; 1991–1995)

The Plymouth Voyager was modified for 1991 with new sheet metal. The S platform was still used, though renamed the "AS platform". These were the last Voyagers that were derived from the Chrysler K platform.

Trim levels were carried over from the previous generation. 1991 Voyagers were available in base, mid-grade SE, high-end LE, and high-end sporty LX. The LX which was available only on short-wheelbase Voyagers, was marketed as a sport-luxury minivan and came with the most standard equipment including alloy wheels, fog lamps, and wide array of power-operated features.

In later years various trim packages were offered on SE models. The "Sport Wagon" package available from 1993 to 1995 featured accent color (gray) bumpers and molding, fog lamps, and special aluminum wheels. The "Rallye" package offered in 1995, took the place of the departed LX model. It was more luxury-oriented, with lower body two-tone paint — regardless of upper body color, the lower body was painted "Driftwood Beige" — silver aluminum wheels, and special badging. The font first used for the Rallye's badging was adopted for all of Plymouth's badging from 1996 onward.

Interiors were more differentiated in this generation than on the first with a redesigned dashboard for 1994 featuring a passenger-side front airbag. and a seating package, marketed as "Quad Command" seating package, available on SE, LE, and LX models. Quad command replaced the 2nd row bench with two individual bucket seats with a center aisle to the 3rd row bench. Interior options varied with trim levels and packages. Cloth seating was standard on all models; leather seating was a standalone extra-cost option on LE and LX models.

Only badging and minor cosmetics differentiated the Voyager from its Dodge Caravan rebadged variant. The Chrysler Town & Country shared the Voyager's headlamps and taillights along with its own chrome waterfall grille. In Mexico, the Voyager was sold as a Chrysler and shared the chrome waterfall grille with the Town & Country.

Innovations
This generation of vans brought additional innovations, including:
 "Quad Command" bucket seating (1990)
 Available All-wheel drive (1990)
 Available anti-lock brakes (1990)
 First driver's side airbag in a minivan (1991), made standard (1991), and first dual front airbags (1993)
 Integrated child safety seats (1991), improved design with recliners (1993)
 First minivan to meet 1998 U.S. federal safety standards (1993)

The turbocharged engine and Convert-A-Bed feature were dropped.

Engines
 1991–1995 2.5 L K I4, 
 1991–1995 3.0 L Mitsubishi 6G72 V6, 
 1991–1993 3.3 L EGA V6, 
 1994–1995 3.3 L EGA V6, 
 1994–1995 3.8 L EGH V6,

Year-to-year changes
 1991: Second-generation minivans released.
1992: A driver's side airbag was made standard for this year. Integrated child safety seats in the second row bench were optional on 1992 Voyagers. The Grand Voyager was available with a lower-cost powertrain. A  3.0 L V6 and a 3-speed automatic could be substituted for the standard  3.3 L V6 with its 4-speed automatic. The 5-speed manual transmission could once again be paired with the base engine, which was now the 2.5 liter four instead of the original 2.2 liter four.
 1993: On 7-passenger models, the optional "Quad Command" bucket seats replaced the middle bench seat. The right bucket tilted forward to ease entry and exit to the rearmost bench. The front shoulder belts became height-adjustable and rear shoulder belts had lower anchor points and the horn button was black.
 1994: New bumpers and body moldings, and a redesigned dashboard appeared on all 1994 Voyagers. New safety features which included a passenger-side airbag and side door-guard beams enabled the Voyager to meet all passenger car safety requirements through 1998. A cassette player became standard on all models but the base, and a CD player was available on all models. Under the hood, a  3.8 L V6 was a new option for top-of-the-line Grand Voyager LE models. The 3.3 L V6 had been upgraded to produce  as well. For 1994 the "10 Year Anniversary Edition" was an option on Voyager SE models; it had unique two-tone paint and badges.
 1995: No major changes were made for 1995, except for the new Rallye option package available on SE models. Rallye models came with special silver-accent wheels and special two-toned paint on the lower body.

Third generation (NS; 1996–2000)

The 1996 Plymouth Voyager was completely redesigned from the ground up. Gone were its K-car underpinnings and architecture, replaced with more modern components and Chrysler's acclaimed cab-forward design. The third generation redesign used the Chrysler NS platform and included a driver's-side sliding door, a minivan first. The Voyager was on Car and Driver magazine's Ten Best list for 1996 and 1997.

In a shift from previous minivans, the third-generation Voyager was marketed as the entry-level Chrysler minivan rather than as a direct counterpart of the Dodge Caravan.  While sharing the same bodyshell, the Voyager and Caravan saw significant changes in body trim and feature content.  Distinguished by a dark gray eggcrate grille (a body-color grille became an option in 1998), the Voyager used matte gray bumpers across all trim levels with matte gray side moldings.   Before calendar year 1996, the NS Voyager was produced with the Pentastar grille emblem and rear badging carried over from the previous model year, shifting to the "sailboat" Plymouth grille emblem and new badging in script font afterward.  

The Voyager retained the base, SE, and LE trims from its predecessor.  To reduce model overlap, the LE trim was discontinued in the United States (in favor of an expanded Town & Country range). To allow the Plymouth brand to remain competitive, the Rallye option package was introduced on the SE trim; along with exterior badging, the Rallye offered interior content featured in LE-trim Voyagers and Caravans.  For 1998, the Rallye trim was renamed Expresso.

Third generation Voyagers and Grand Voyagers were equipped nearly identically to their Dodge counterparts, save for front fascias, badging, and the wheels on LE-trim vans, which are shared with the Town & Country. However, to maintain its position as the entry-level minivan, the Voyager was never produced with automatic headlights, fog lights, power driver's seat and power mirror memory, or auto-dimming rear view mirrors. All-wheel drive was also discontinued in some markets. The vinyl woodgrain-appearance side paneling was no longer available, as the new side sheetmetal was no longer flat.

Third generation Voyagers introduced a new system of rear seats to simplify installation, removal, and re-positioning— marketed as "Easy-Out Roller Seats". All Voyagers and Grand Voyagers were equipped with this feature. When installed, the 2nd and 3rd row seats (either bucket or bench seats) are latched to floor-mounted strikers. When unlatched, eight rollers lifted each seat, allowing it to be rolled fore and aft. Tracks had locator depressions for rollers, thus enabling simple installation. Ergonomic levers at the seatbacks released the floor latches single-handedly without tools and raised the seats onto the rollers in a single motion. Additionally, seatbacks were designed to fold forward. Seat roller tracks were permanently attached to the floor and seat stanchions were aligned, facilitating the longitudinal rolling of the seats. Bench seat stanchions were moved inboard to reduce bending stress in the seat frames, allowing them to be lighter.

Engines
 1996–2000 2.4 L EDZ I4,  (Canadian vans beginning in 1999 included a 3.0 L V6 as standard equipment)
 1996–2000 3.0 L Mitsubishi 6G72 V6 ,  (not available in certain U.S. states, 3.3 L V6 offered as standard equipment in those states instead)
 1996–2000 3.3 L EGA V6, 
 1996–1997 3.8 L EGH V6, 
 1998–1999 3.8 L EGH V6,

Year-to-year changes
 1996: As running changes during this model year, the Pentastar front logo and rear badging carried over from the previous generation were replaced with the new "sailboat" logo and script font, while the front interior door panels were redesigned, losing the discrete grab handles in favor of ones integrated into the armrests. Another running change saw the elimination of the plastic intake manifold cover from the 3.8L engine.
 1997: A CD player was a new option. Other than that, only minimal changes.
 1998: Grocery bag hooks were added to the rearmost bench. The Rallye package was renamed Expresso and now included new wheel covers (if equipped with steel wheels), a standard CD player and a body-colored grille). SE models with optional low-back seats and LE models received updated cloth upholstery. As a running change during this model year, the HVAC vents on the driver's side and in the center of the dashboard were changed to a more conventional design.
 1999: The 3.8 L V6 was made available for front-wheel drive SE models. A small cargo net between the front seats, additional standard equipment, integrated child-safety seats and second-row buckets were added to the Voyager this year. Air conditioning was made standard on SE models. In Canada, the 3.0L V6 was made standard equipment. 1999 also saw the addition of a one-year-only 15th anniversary "Platinum Edition", to mark Caravan's 15th year of production. This package was offered on various trim levels, and included Platinum Metallic paint, and fender badges.
 2000: Now standard on all models was air conditioning, power windows, and power locks (the latter two standard on SE models only). A dealer-installed rear-seat video entertainment system was newly available on all models. The 2000 model year offered packages which included the "2000+" and "Millennium" package; however these were little more than unique fender badges on vans with popular equipment. As Chrysler withdrew the Plymouth brand, the Voyager was marketed by both Chrysler and Plymouth during this model year.

Crash test results
The 1996-2000 Dodge Grand Caravan (twin of the Voyager/Grand Voyager) received a "Marginal" rating in the Insurance Institute for Highway Safety's 40 mph offset test. The structural performance and restraints were graded "Acceptable", but the foot injuries were very high.

In the NHTSA crash tests, it received 4 stars for the driver and front passenger in the frontal-impact. In the side-impact test, it received 5 stars for the driver, and 3 stars for the rear occupant, and resulted in a fuel leak that could cause a fire hazard.

Discontinuation

Following the retirement of the Plymouth brand after the 2000 model year, the Voyager nameplate was continued by the Chrysler division.  While used by all exported Chrysler minivans since 1988, in North America, the Chrysler Voyager served as the lowest-trim Chrysler-brand minivan.  Offered only in a short-wheelbase configuration, the Voyager continued with matte-black bumpers and exterior trim.  Following the 2001 introduction of the RS-generation minivans, the Voyager was distinguished by a winged Chrysler emblem atop a black plastic grille (a shape adopted by the later PT Cruiser).      

For 2004, Chrysler discontinued the Voyager in the United States and Canada, replacing the model line by the Dodge Caravan and a short-wheelbase Town & Country (the Voyager remained in Mexico through 2007).  In markets outside of North America, the nameplate remained in use through 2016 for all export versions (as both a Chrysler and a Lancia).    

After skipping the 2008-2020 fifth generation, the Voyager nameplate returned to use in North America for 2020 production, slotted below the Chrysler Pacifica and effectively replacing the Dodge Grand Caravan.

Trim levels
Base – 1984–2000
LE – 1984–1995 (unavailable in US for third generation; replaced by standalone Rallye and Expresso models)
SE – 1984–2000
LX – 1989–1992
Sport Wagon – 1993–1995 (package available on SE and LE)
Rallye – 1995–1997 (1995 as a package on SE and LE; 1996–1997 as either a package on SE or standalone model)
Expresso – 1998–2000 (as a package on SE or standalone model)

References

External links

 Allpar.com minivans - Plymouth Voyager/Grand Voyager for all generations
 
 ConsumerGuide: Second Generation Voyager
 ConsumerGuide: Third Generation Voyager

1990s cars
2000s cars
All-wheel-drive vehicles
Flexible-fuel vehicles
Front-wheel-drive vehicles
Minivans
Voyager
Rear-wheel-drive vehicles
Vans
Cars introduced in 1974
Cars introduced in 1984
Cars discontinued in 2000